The tambora (from the Spanish word tambor, meaning "drum") is a two headed drum. In many countries, and especially in the Dominican Republic, tamboras were made from salvaged rum barrels. Performers on the tambora are referred to as tamboreros.

There are different types of tamboras, including:
Tambora (Dominican drum), an Afro-Caribbean percussion instrument
Tambora (Argentinian drum), a percussion instrument
Tambora (Bolivian drum), a percussion instrument
Tambora (Colombian drum), a percussion instrument
Tambora (Mexican drum), a percussion instrument
Tambora (Panamanian drum), a percussion instrument
Tambora (Venezuelan drum), a percussion instrument

See also
 Tambora (disambiguation)

Hand drums
Central American and Caribbean percussion instruments